In Australian Aboriginal religion and mythology, Binbeal is the god of rainbows. He is a son of Bunjil.

References

Australian Aboriginal gods
Sky and weather gods